Newbridge is a hamlet, near Pickering in North Yorkshire, England.

Hamlets in North Yorkshire
Pickering, North Yorkshire